is a space shoot 'em up game released for arcades in 1979. It was developed and distributed by Data East in Japan and was distributed in North America by Sega/Gremlin.

Gameplay

Astro Fighter consists of 4 waves and a refueling stage, which are then repeated with increasingly higher difficulty. The player's task is to eliminate the four successive waves of different types of attacking craft, while avoiding being hit by missiles and bombs, and then refuel by shooting the 'GS' ship before repeating the process. The player starts with 3 lives and receives a bonus life on reaching a score of 5000. 300 bonus points are received for shooting each 6 falling bombs and for 950 for hitting the GS ship accurately on the first shot. A very large bonus of 10,000 is given for getting through 4 waves and refueling by using exactly 2 shots more than the minimum needed.

Reception
In North America, it was the fourth top-grossing video game on the Play Meter arcade charts from September to October 1980.

References

External links

Astro Fighter at Arcade History

1979 video games
Arcade video games
Arcade-only video games
Data East video games
Fixed shooters
Gremlin Industries games
Video games developed in Japan
Data East arcade games